The Chocó vireo (Vireo masteri) is a species of bird in the family Vireonidae that was discovered by Paul Salaman in 1991 and described in 1996. It is found in western Colombia and has recently been found in north-west Ecuador. Its natural habitat is subtropical or tropical moist montane forests. It is threatened by habitat loss.

Discovery

The Chocó vireo was first observed on August 25, 1991, by Paul Salaman in western Nariño located in southwest Colombia. The site, located at an altitude of 1,500 meters (five thousand feet), was in a narrow strip of intact, very wet forest along the Rio Nambi, in the Chocó region which is famed for its high biological diversity. In early June, 1992, ornithologist Gary Stiles observed and collected this species while working in Alto de Pisones in Risaralda department.  The bird was small, a little more than four inches, lightweight at 11.4 grams, and greenish in color with a broad, wide yellowish wing bar. It had a distinctive facial pattern with a long white stripe above its eye.

Salaman decided to take the novel approach of auctioning off the naming rights to the vireo's scientific name in order to raise money for conservation of the bird's habitat. Bernard Master, the first American birder to have seen a representative of every bird family in the world, won the auction with a bid of US$75,000 and named it Vireo masteri. This donation was used to create the Pangan ProAves Reserve in Colombia.

References

Chocó vireo
Birds of the Colombian Andes
Birds of the Tumbes-Chocó-Magdalena
Chocó vireo
Chocó vireo
Taxonomy articles created by Polbot
Fauna of the northwestern Andean montane forests